"I May Be Used (But Baby I Ain't Used Up)" is a song written by Bob McDill, and recorded by American country music artist Waylon Jennings.  It was released in March 1984 as the third single from the album Waylon and Company.  The song reached number 4 on the ''Hot Country Songs chart.

Chart performance

References

1984 singles
Waylon Jennings songs
Songs written by Bob McDill
RCA Records singles
1983 songs